The canton of Belley is one of the cantons of France and is located in the department of Ain and in the region of Auvergne-Rhône-Alpes.

Geography
This canton is organized around Belley in the Arrondissement of Belley. Its altitude is between 203 meters in (Brégnier-Cordon) and 1,020 meters in (Conzieu) with an average of 286 m.

Composition
At the French canton reorganisation which came into effect in March 2015, the canton was expanded from 24 to 37 communes (6 of which merged into the new communes Arboys-en-Bugey, Parves-et-Nattages and Chazey-Bons):
 
Ambléon
Andert-et-Condon
Arboys-en-Bugey
Belley
Brégnier-Cordon
Brens
La Burbanche
Ceyzérieu
Chazey-Bons 
Cheignieu-la-Balme 
Colomieu
Contrevoz
Conzieu
Cressin-Rochefort
Cuzieu
Flaxieu
Groslée-Saint-Benoît
Izieu
Lavours
Magnieu
Marignieu
Massignieu-de-Rives
Murs-et-Gélignieux
Parves-et-Nattages
Peyrieu
Pollieu
Prémeyzel
Rossillon
Saint-Germain-les-Paroisses
Saint-Martin-de-Bavel
Virieu-le-Grand
Virignin
Vongnes

Demographics

See also
 Cantons of the Ain department
 Arrondissement of Belley

References

Belley